FC Münsingen is a Swiss football club from the town of Münsingen in Canton Bern, the German-speaking region of Switzerland. The team currently plays in the Promotion League, third highest tier in the Swiss football pyramid.

History

Among the sporting highlights of the recent past include Swiss Cup matches against Super League teams Neuchâtel Xamax in 1992 and FC Basel in 1996.

At the end of the 2007/08 season the club narrowly missed out on promotion to the Challenge League.

Stadium

The club play their home games at Sportanlage Sandreutenen. The capacity is 1,400. The stadium has 200 seats and 1,200 standing places.

External links
Official Website 
Soccerway.com profile 
Football.ch profile 

Munsingen
Association football clubs established in 1928
1928 establishments in Switzerland